The Led Zeppelin Deluxe Edition is a series of albums reissued by English rock group Led Zeppelin, distributed by Atlantic Records. It contains all nine of the original Led Zeppelin studio albums remastered from the original analog tapes. Along with the remastered albums, there is a companion disc with each album, consisting of previously unreleased audio tracks and alternate mixes of released tracks. Many of these are described as work-in-progress or alternate mixes made during the original production rather than new remixes generated to highlight discarded recording elements (as did the remixes made for The Beatles Anthology).  The first companion album consists of the 10 October 1969 concert in Paris. The albums were released in chronological order, each with inverted album covers.

The first wave of albums, Led Zeppelin, Led Zeppelin II, and Led Zeppelin III, was released on 2 June 2014. The second wave of albums, Led Zeppelin IV and Houses of the Holy, was released on 27 October 2014. Physical Graffiti was released on 23 February 2015, almost exactly forty years to the day after the original release. The fourth and final wave of albums, Presence, In Through the Out Door, and Coda, was released on 31 July 2015.

Led Zeppelin

 Track 1 was 4:05 on the high-resolution and iTunes downloads including applause at the end of the track, before the album was released, and is now 3:52, segueing directly to track 2.  It is unclear whether the shorter version corrects a mistake and/or is a time-saving measure.

Differences
While the Deluxe Edition are not studio outtakes, the differences of songs by format are listed below (differences will be from viewpoint of the Deluxe Edition tracks):
"Good Times Bad Times" – Only intro riff is played, opening for the disc 2 track of "Good Times Bad Times/Communication Breakdown".
"Babe I'm Gonna Leave You" – Not included.
"You Shook Me" – Includes a vocal and guitar back-and-forth style part towards the end.
"Dazed and Confused" – Has an extended bow section.
"Your Time Is Gonna Come" – Not included.
"Black Mountain Side" – Named "White Summer/Black Mountain Side" on the companion disc.  Included as part of guitar medley "White Summer/Black Mountain Side".
"Communication Breakdown" – Included after "Good Times Bad Times" intro riff, titled in disc 2 as "Good Times Bad Times/Communication Breakdown", and includes a short blues breakdown just before the finish.
"I Can't Quit You Baby" – Intro is instrumental before the lyrics "I can't quit you...". Also see version below in Coda (Deluxe Edition).
"How Many More Times" – Included.
"Heartbreaker" – Included, but a Led Zeppelin II track.
"Moby Dick" – Included in this version is a change in the intro riff, the first round of the riff is cut off by tuning, then it goes directly into the second round with short guitar solos, but a Led Zeppelin II track.

Led Zeppelin II

Differences
The differences between each track is listed below (differences will be from viewpoint of the Deluxe Edition tracks):
"Whole Lotta Love" – Different vocal track (back to original after solo section), breakdown section is much simpler, with much less theremin, no solo guitar track
"What Is and What Should Never Be" – The "ah" vocal sung after "...and you will be mine, by taking our time." includes Robert Plant's voice, as opposed to only being the backing vocals.
"The Lemon Song" – Not included.
"Thank You" – No vocals, slightly different drum intro, cuts off at the false ending.
"Heartbreaker" – Different guitar track for the first solo (before the drums and bass come in).
"Living Loving Maid (She's Just a Woman)" – No vocals, the riff is extended for a longer time at the end of the song.
"Ramble On" – There is no first or second solo, there is only vocal track at the end, the song is extended at the end.
"Moby Dick" – There is no drum solo, only a count in, and there is an extra chord at the end.
"Bring It On Home" – Not included in Led Zeppelin II (Deluxe Edition), see info below in Coda (Deluxe Edition)
"La La" – Only in Deluxe Edition.

Led Zeppelin III

Differences
The differences between each track is listed below (differences will be from viewpoint of the Deluxe Edition tracks):
"Immigrant Song" – Named "The Immigrant Song" on the companion disc.  Less reverb, slightly different outro vocals.
"Friends" – No vocal, no segue into "Celebration Day". Also see version below in Coda (Deluxe Edition).
"Celebration Day" – No segue from "Friends", cut off from vocals, "If you walk you're gonna get there..."
"Since I've Been Loving You" – Different take, slightly different lyrics. 6:59 to the end of the track was used on the normal studio version.
"Out on the Tiles" – Named "Bathroom Sound" on the companion disc.  The latter is the name for disc 2, no vocals, cut off slightly sooner.
"Gallows Pole" – No mandolin, track extended.
"Tangerine" – Not included.
"That's the Way" – Original track had vari-speed to slow it down and lower it a half step. Fewer overdubs and effects on this version.
"Bron-Y-Aur Stomp" – Named "Jennings Farm Blues" on the companion disc.  An early version of "Bron-Y-Aur Stomp" that is electric and bluesy as opposed to acoustic and folky.
"Hats Off to (Roy) Harper" – Not included.
"Key to the Highway/Trouble in Mind" – Only in Deluxe Edition.

Untitled (Led Zeppelin IV)

Differences
The differences between each track is listed below (differences will be from viewpoint of the Deluxe Edition tracks):
"Black Dog" – Single vocal track, no solo guitar track, fade out sooner.
"Rock and Roll" – Fewer overdubs, slightly less reverb.
"The Battle of Evermore" – No vocals, bridge in standard track becomes the outro.
"Stairway to Heaven" – The flute track does not cross over into the middle section, the F-A-C-E-D-C riff guitar track is played directly after the solo as opposed to a few lines after. There are no harmony vocals in the last verse.
"Misty Mountain Hop" – Track extends a few more seconds
"Four Sticks" – Beginning of track includes a count-in of "1-2-3-4-5-6-1-2-3-1", cuts off earlier. Also see version below in Coda (Deluxe Edition) titled "Four Hands".
"Going to California" – No vocals.
"When the Levee Breaks" – One harmonica track removed. Also see version below in Coda (Deluxe Edition) titled "If It Keeps On Raining".

Houses of the Holy

Differences
The differences between each track is listed below (differences will be from viewpoint of the Deluxe Edition tracks):

"The Song Remains the Same" – No vocals, alternate guitar tracks.
"The Rain Song" – Different mix.
"Over the Hills and Far Away" – Mono guitar intro, no vocals, different outro.
"The Crunge" – Different mix.
"Dancing Days" – Different mix, bass more upfront.
"D'yer Mak'er" – Not included.
"No Quarter" – Lower pitched, slightly fewer overdubs, no vocals.
"The Ocean" – Different mix, additional vocals.

Physical Graffiti

Differences
The differences between each track is listed below (differences will be from viewpoint of the Deluxe Edition tracks):

"Custard Pie" – Not included.
"The Rover" – Not included.
"In My Time of Dying" – No guitar overdubs, most during solos around 5:00 and 6:30, as the solos are different
"Houses of the Holy" – Cowbell and tambourine are more pronounced, at 1:22, 1:53, 2:26, 2:58.  There is a vocal harmony at 2:00 and the vocals are clipped at 2:13.  Also, the "hoo-hoo" backing vocals are more pronounced at 2:58.
"Trampled Under Foot" – Named "Brandy and Coke" on the companion disc.  Fewer guitar overdubs, no bass guitar and the drum track is brought forward more.
"Kashmir" – Named "Driving Through Kashmir" on the companion disc.  Orchestra is brought slightly more forward in the mix.
"In the Light" – Named "Everybody Makes It Through" on the companion disc.  It features a different structure and alternate lyrics.  Also, a different clavinet riff is used in the opening and throughout the track. Also see info below in Coda (Deluxe Edition) for a rough mix version of "Everybody Makes It Through"
"Bron-Yr-Aur" – Not included.
"Down By the Seaside" – Not included.
"Ten Years Gone" – Not included.
"Night Flight" – Not included.
"The Wanton Song" – Not included in Physical Graffiti (Deluxe Edition), see info below in Coda (Deluxe Edition) for track titled "Desire".
"Boogie With Stu" – The mandolin "solo" used in the middle of the song is also used to open the track. Different stereo mix.
"Black Country Woman" – Not included.
"Sick Again" – No Vocals. This is a completely different version with Jimmy Page on bass guitar.  Fewer guitar overdubs and the track is two minutes shorter.

Presence

All tracks written by Jimmy Page and Robert Plant, except "Royal Orleans" by John Bonham, John Paul Jones, Page, and Plant and "10 Ribs & All/Carrot Pod Pod (Pod)" by Jones and Page.

Differences
The differences between each track is listed below (differences will be from viewpoint of the Deluxe Edition tracks):
"Achilles Last Stand" – Named "Two Ones Are Won" on the companion disc.  Rhythm of outro riff is different and a vocal track near the end removed.
"For Your Life" – Vocals are doubled. No intro ad-lib. Around 3:15 to 3:33 there is additional ad-lib. Solo is different around 4:17 to 5:03.  
"10 Ribs & All/Carrot Pod Pod" – Only in Deluxe Edition.
"Royal Orleans" – 'Dr. John' styled vocals by Robert Plant.
"Nobody's Fault but Mine" – Not included.
"Candy Store Rock" – Not included.
"Hots On for Nowhere" – Version has no overdubs, final few seconds have additional lyrics.
"Tea for One" – Not included.

In Through the Out Door

Differences
The differences between each track is listed below (differences will be from viewpoint of the Deluxe Edition tracks):
"In the Evening" – Slightly different intro.  Vocals are "dry" (whereas the 1979-issued mix has delay applied). A flute-like counter melody appears at approx. 4:30.
"South Bound Saurez" – Named "Southbound Piano" on the companion disc. Piano and guitar are brought more forward in the mix.  
"Fool in the Rain" – Mono mix.
"Hot Dog" – Piano and guitar are brought more forward in the mix.
"Carouselambra" – Named "The Epic" on the companion disc. Fewer keyboard overdubs, the bass guitar is turned down slightly, and the guitar and vocals are brought more forward in the mix in the first portion of the song.
"All My Love" – Named "The Hook" on the companion disc. Mono mix.  
"I'm Gonna Crawl" – Named "Blot" on the companion disc. Mono mix.

Coda

All tracks produced by Jimmy Page, except for "Travelling Riverside Blues", produced by Robert Johnson.

The CD edition of the album incorrectly lists the running time of "Bring It On Home" (Rough Mix) as 4:19, which is actually the exact time of the finished version listed on Led Zeppelin II.

Differences
The differences between each track is listed below (differences will be from viewpoint of the Deluxe Edition tracks):
"We're Gonna Groove" – More vocals. Differences in guitar takes starting around 1:15. Vocal addition around 1:30.
"Poor Tom" – No vocals.
"I Can't Quit You Baby" – Differs from Led Zeppelin track in format by having a longer drum outro.
"Walter's Walk" – No vocals. Repeats intro at 1:15.
"Ozone Baby" – Not included.
"Darlene" – Not included.
"Bonzo's Montreux" – A different construction of the original.
"Wearing and Tearing" – Not included.
"If It Keeps On Raining" – Early version of the Led Zeppelin IV track "When the Levee Breaks". This version is faster, has different lyrics, an intro that is accompanied by a bass riff, and is shorter by 3 minutes.
"Baby Come On Home" – Originally included on 1993 Boxed Set 2 and the 1993 extended version of Coda from The Complete Studio Recordings and 2008 Definitive Collection. 
"Sugar Mama" – Led Zeppelin era recording, only on Deluxe Edition.
"Travelling Riverside Blues" – Originally included on 1990 Boxed Set and the 1993 extended version of Coda from The Complete Studio Recordings and 2008 Definitive Collection. The track was also released separately from Coda as a part of the BBC Sessions.
"Hey, Hey, What Can I Do" – Originally released on the b-side of the 1970 Led Zeppelin III single, "Immigrant Song." Later included on the 1993 extended version of Coda from The Complete Studio Recordings and 2008 Definitive Collection.
"Four Hands" – A different version of the Led Zeppelin IV track "Four Sticks" played by Page and Plant along with the Bombay Orchestra.
"Friends" –  A different version of the Led Zeppelin III track played by Page and Plant along with the Bombay Orchestra.
"St. Tristan's Sword" –  Led Zeppelin III era recording, only on Deluxe Edition.
"Desire" – Version of the Physical Graffiti track "The Wanton Song". Features John Paul Jones on clavinet, fewer overdubs and Plant's vocals are clearer.
"Bring It On Home" – Version of the Led Zeppelin II track, strictly the middle part (not the blues cover intro/outro).
"Everybody Makes It Through" – A conglomerate version of the Physical Graffiti (Deluxe Edition) vocal track with the drums and drone of the Physical Graffiti track "In the Light".

Personnel
Led Zeppelin
John Bonham – drums, timpani, gong, backing vocals on Led Zeppelin and Houses of the Holy
John Paul Jones – Four and eight-string bass guitars,  organ, keyboards, synthesizer, mandolin, recorders, harpsichord, Mellotron, backing vocals on Led Zeppelin, and Houses of the Holy, acoustic guitar on "The Battle of Evermore"
Jimmy Page – acoustic, electric, and pedal steel guitar, banjo, theremin, backing vocals on Led Zeppelin, mandolin on "The Battle of Evermore", production
Robert Plant – lead and overdubbed backing vocals, harmonica, acoustic guitar on "Boogie with Stu"

Additional musicians
Sandy Denny – vocals on "The Battle of Evermore"
Viram Jasani – tabla on "Black Mountain Side"
Ian Stewart – piano on "Rock and Roll" and "Boogie with Stu"

Production
Barrington Colby – illustrations
Peter Corriston – design and package concept
Cameron Crowe – liner notes
John C. F. Davis – remastering
Peter Hewitt-Dutton - Audio restoration
Mike Doud – design and package concept
Chris Dreja – photography
Elliott Erwitt – photography
BP Fallon – photography
Peter Grant – executive producer on original recordings
Ross Halfin – photo research
George Hardie – cover design
Roy Harper – photography
Dave Heffernan – illustrations
David Juniper – artwork
Maurice Tate – photo tinting
Jeremy Gee – tape engineering (on Presence)
George Hardie – sleeve design (on Presence)
Keith Harwood – engineering, mixing (on Presence)
Hipgnosis – sleeve design (on Houses of the Holy, Presence, In Through the Out Door, and Coda)
Jeff Ocheltree – drum tech with John Bonham (on In Through the Out Door)
Leif Mases – engineering (on In Through the Out Door)
Lennart Östlund – assistant engineering (on In Through the Out Door)
Stuart Epps – engineering (on Coda)
Andy Johns – engineering (on Coda)
Eddie Kramer – engineering (on Coda)
Vic Maile – engineering (on Coda)
Leif Masses – engineering (on Coda)
John Timperley – engineering (on Coda)
Studio Fury – Deluxe edition cover design

References

External links
Led Zeppelin official website - Album information

2014 compilation albums
2015 compilation albums
Albums produced by Jimmy Page
Atlantic Records compilation albums
Led Zeppelin compilation albums
Reissue albums